Reinold "Rein" Ozoline (born 18 May 1967 in St.Peterburg Russia an Australian former wrestler who competed in the 1996 Summer Olympics and in the 2000 Summer Olympics.

References

External links
 

1967 births
Living people
Olympic wrestlers of Australia
Wrestlers at the 1996 Summer Olympics
Wrestlers at the 2000 Summer Olympics
Australian male sport wrestlers
Commonwealth Games silver medallists for Australia
Commonwealth Games bronze medallists for Australia
Wrestlers at the 1994 Commonwealth Games
Wrestlers at the 2002 Commonwealth Games
Commonwealth Games medallists in wrestling
Medallists at the 1994 Commonwealth Games